Bear Creek Township may refer to:

Arkansas
 Bear Creek Township, Boone County, Arkansas, defunct
 Bear Creek Township, Sevier County, Arkansas
 Bear Creek No. 4 Township, Searcy County, Arkansas
 Bear Creek No. 5 Township, Searcy County, Arkansas
 Bear Creek No. 6 Township, Searcy County, Arkansas

Illinois
 Bear Creek Township, Christian County, Illinois
 Bear Creek Township, Hancock County, Illinois

Indiana
 Bearcreek Township, Jay County, Indiana

Iowa
 Bear Creek Township, Poweshiek County, Iowa

Kansas
 Bear Creek Township, Hamilton County, Kansas

Michigan
 Bear Creek Township, Michigan

Minnesota
 Bear Creek Township, Clearwater County, Minnesota

Missouri
 Bear Creek Township, Henry County, Missouri
 Bear Creek Township, Montgomery County, Missouri

North Carolina
 Bear Creek Township, North Carolina

North Dakota
 Bear Creek Township, Dickey County, North Dakota, in Dickey County, North Dakota

Pennsylvania
 Bear Creek Township, Luzerne County, Pennsylvania

Township name disambiguation pages